The 1988–89 OHL season was the ninth season of the Ontario Hockey League. The Hamilton Steelhawks move to Niagara Falls becoming the Niagara Falls Thunder. The Kingston Canadians rename themselves to the Kingston Raiders. The OHL awards the inaugural Bill Long Award for distinguished service to the OHL. Fifteen teams each played 66 games. The Peterborough Petes won the J. Ross Robertson Cup, defeating the Niagara Falls Thunder.

Relocation/Team Name Change

Hamilton Steelhawks to Niagara Falls Thunder

The Hamilton Steelhawks relocated their franchise to the city of Niagara Falls after four seasons in Hamilton. The club was renamed as the Niagara Falls Thunder and would play out of the Niagara Falls Memorial Arena. The Thunder would remain in the Emms Division.

This would be the first club since the Niagara Falls Flyers, who relocated to North Bay in 1982, to be based out of the city.

Kingston Canadians to Kingston Raiders

The Kingston Canadians were rebranded as the Kingston Raiders for the 1988-89 season. Kingston had used the Canadians name since they were announced as an expansion club in 1973. The club changed their colour scheme from red, blue and white to black, silver and white, effectively stealing the NFL's Los Angeles Raiders' name and color scheme.

Regular season

Final standings
Note: GP = Games played; W = Wins; L = Losses; T = Ties; GF = Goals for; GA = Goals against; PTS = Points; x = clinched playoff berth; y = clinched division title

Leyden Division

Emms Division

Scoring leaders

Playoffs

Division quarter-finals

Leyden Division

(1) Peterborough Petes vs. (6) Belleville Bulls

(2) Oshawa Generals vs. (5) Ottawa 67's

(3) Toronto Marlboros vs. (4) Cornwall Royals

Emms Division

(1) Kitchener Rangers vs. (6) North Bay Centennials

(2) Niagara Falls Thunder vs. (5) Windsor Compuware Spitfires

(3) London Knights vs. (4) Guelph Platers

Division semi-finals

Leyden Division

(4) Cornwall Royals vs. (5) Ottawa 67's

Emms Division

(3) London Knights vs. (6) North Bay Centennials

Division finals

Leyden Division

(1) Peterborough Petes vs. (4) Cornwall Royals

Emms Division

(2) Niagara Falls Thunder vs. (3) London Knights

J. Ross Robertson Cup

(L1) Peterborough Petes vs. (E2) Niagara Falls Thunder

Awards

1989 OHL Priority Selection
The Sault Ste. Marie Greyhounds held the first overall pick in the 1989 Ontario Priority Selection and selected Eric Lindros from the St. Michael's Buzzers. Lindros was awarded the Jack Ferguson Award, awarded to the top pick in the draft.

Below are the players who were selected in the first round of the 1989 Ontario Hockey League Priority Selection.

See also
List of OHA Junior A standings
List of OHL seasons
1989 Memorial Cup
1989 NHL Entry Draft
1988 in sports
1989 in sports

References

HockeyDB

Ontario Hockey League seasons
OHL